Hiroki Yokoyama may refer to:

Hiroki Yokoyama (baseball) (born 1992), Japanese baseball player
Hiroki Yokoyama (runner), Japanese marathon runner, winner of the Kyoto Marathon in 2014 and 2015
Hiroki Yokoyama (speed skater) (born 1994), Japanese speed skater